
Gmina Strzyżów is an urban-rural gmina (administrative district) in Strzyżów County, Subcarpathian Voivodeship, in south-eastern Poland.

The gmina contains part of the protected area called Czarnorzeki-Strzyżów Landscape Park.

Villages
Apart from the town of Strzyżów, Gmina Strzyżów contains the villages and settlements of Bonarówka, Brzeżanka, Dobrzechów, Gbiska, Glinik Charzewski, Glinik Zaborowski, Godowa, Grodzisko, Łętownia, Tropie, Wysoka Strzyżowska, Żarnowa, Zawadka and Żyznów.

Neighbouring gminas
Gmina Strzyżów is bordered by the gminas of Czudec, Korczyna, Niebylec, Wielopole Skrzyńskie, Wiśniowa and Wojaszówka.

References
Polish official population figures 2006

Strzyzow
Strzyżów County